Rhabdopleura annulata is a sessile hemichordate. It is a suspension feeder that secretes tubes on the ocean floor.

Distribution
It is found in the Indo-Pacific region, off the coasts of Indonesia, South Australia, Tasmania, and New Zealand.

References

annulata
Animals described in 1921
Fauna of the Pacific Ocean